Songs from a Stolen Spring is a compilation album that mainly features duets and mashups of protest and peace songs performed by pairings of Western musicians with their contemporaries from the countries where the Arab Spring took place.

Track listing

References

External links
 Valley Entertainment (Western Release)
 Kirkelig Kulturverksted (Eastern Release)

2014 compilation albums
Valley Entertainment compilation albums